Pighammer is the only solo album by American musician Wayne Static, released on October 4, 2011, through Dirthouse Records, and the final album released during his lifetime. It debuted at number 97 on the Billboard 200 with first-week sales of 4,700.

Concept
Static explained the album's concept:

Static's "transformation" was in reference to his decision to stop his drug use as of 2009. Static wrote the album as a tribute to his new drug-free life, in hopes of inspiring others to get clean as well.

Track listing

Personnel
 Wayne Static – vocals, all instruments, producer
 Tera Wray – additional vocals
 Jack Keener – engineering & mixing
 Nelly Recchia – photography & makeup

Chart positions

References

2011 debut albums
Wayne Static albums